Saint Aichardus (or Achard, Achart, Aicard, Aichard; died 687) was a Frankish Benedictine monk and abbot known for his austerity.
He became abbot of Jumièges Abbey, a major religious center that was home to 900 monks.
His feast day is 15 September.

History  
Saint Aichardus was the son of a military officer of Chlothar II, King of the Franks.
He received a monastic education in Poitiers.
He spent 39 years at this monastery.
When Saint Philibert of Jumièges founded a Benedictine monastery in Quinçay he appointed Aichardus as prior.
Philibert died in Jumièges Abbey, and Aichardus succeeded him as abbot of Jumieges.
He died in 687 at Jumièges Abbey.

Monks of Ramsgate account

The monks of St Augustine's Abbey, Ramsgate, wrote in their Book of Saints (1921),

Donnelly's account

Eleanor Cecilia Donnelly in her Short Lives of the Saints (1910) wrote,

Butler's account

The hagiographer Alban Butler ( 1710–1773) wrote in his Lives of the Fathers, Martyrs, and Other Principal Saints, under September 15,

References

Sources

 

 
 

7th-century Frankish saints
Frankish Benedictines
687 deaths